The 1982 Bristol Open, also known by its sponsored name Lambert & Butler Championships, was a men's tennis tournament played on outdoor grass courts in Bristol, England that was part of the 1982 Volvo Grand Prix. It was the third edition of the tournament and was played from 14 June until 19 June 1982. Unseeded John Alexander won the singles title.

Finals

Singles

 John Alexander defeated  Tim Mayotte 6–3, 6–4
 It was Alexander's 1st singles title of the year and the 5th of his career.

Doubles

 Tim Gullikson /  Tom Gullikson defeated  Mark Edmondson /  Kim Warwick 6–4, 7–6
 It was Tim Gullikson's 2nd title of the year and the 13th of his career. It was Tom Gullikson's 3rd title of the year and the 11th of his career.

References

External links
 ITF tournament edition details

 
Bristol Open
Bristol Open
1982 in English tennis